Koepp may refer to:
 David Koepp (born 1963), American screenwriter and director
 Jean-Pierre Koepp (1934–2010), politician and restaurateur in Luxembourg
 Stephen Koepp, executive editor of Fortune Magazine
 Volker Koepp (born 1944), German documentary film producer